Lonchocarpus violaceus is a species of evergreen tree in the family Fabaceae. It is native to the Caribbean and northern South America. It has been introduced to Florida. Its names include lilac tree, greenheart, Spanish ash, and lancepod.

According to some sources L. violaceus was used by the Maya peoples to produce the alcoholic beverage, balché. It is likely they are actually referring to L. longistylus which was once synonymized with L. violaceus.

References

violaceus
Flora of South America
Flora of the Caribbean
Flora without expected TNC conservation status